Mary Carr (née Kenevan; March 14, 1874 – June 24, 1973), was an American film actress and was married to the actor William Carr. She appeared in more than 140 films between 1915 and 1956. She was given some of filmdoms plum mother roles in silent pictures, especially Fox's 1920 Over the Hill to the Poorhouse which was a great success. She was interred in Calvary Cemetery. Carr bore a strong resemblance to Lucy Beaumont, another famous character actress of the time who specialized in mother roles. As older actresses such as Mary Maurice and Anna Townsend passed on, Carr, still in her forties, seem to inherit all the matriarchal roles in silent films.

Mary Carr appeared on the June 9, 1954 episode of the radio quiz program "You Bet Your Life", hosted by comedian Groucho Marx.

The Carrs' oldest son, William, died at two years of age. Almost all of her children were involved in the film business and appeared with her in Over the Hill.  They are as follows:
John Carr
Stephen Carr
Thomas Carr 
Rosemary Carr
Maybeth (Mary Elizabeth) Carr m. Pete Carpenter
Marie Luella Carr Walsh

Filmography

Silent films

 The Shadow of Tragedy (1915 short)
 The Mirror (1915 short) as Mrs. Carr
 Blaming the Duck, or Ducking the Blame (1915 short) as Mrs. Carr
 The City of Failing Light (1916) as Mrs. William Carr, lost
 Souls in Bondage (1916) as Mrs. Carr, lost
 Her Bleeding Heart (1916) as Mrs. Carr, lost
 The Flames of Johannis (1916) as Mrs. Carr, lost
 Love's Toll (1916) as Mrs. Carr, lost
 The Light at Dusk (1916) as Mary Kennevan Carr, lost
 The Barrier (1917) as Mary Kennevan Carr, lost
 The Beloved Rogue (1918) lost (not to be confused with 1917 film Beloved Rogues)
 The Sign Invisible (1918) as Mary Kennevan Carr, lost
 My Own United States (1918) as Mary Kennevan Carr, lost
 To the Highest Bidder (1918) lost
 The Birth of a Race (1918) as Mary K. Carr, extant
 The Lion and the Mouse (1919) lost
 Mrs. Wiggs of the Cabbage Patch (1919) extant, in the Library of Congress
 Calibre 38 (1919) as Mary Kennevan Carr, incomplete, Library of Congress
 The Spark Divine (1919) lost
 Over the Hill to the Poorhouse (1920) extant
 Thunderclap (1921) lost
 Silver Wings (1922) lost
 The Custard Cup (1923) lost
 You Are Guilty (1923) extant, may be the LOC Kodascope abridged version
 Loyal Lives (1923) extant, incomplete or abridged
 The Daring Years (1923) lost
 On the Banks of the Wabash (1923) (*abridged version exists;private collector)
 Broadway Broke (1923) Lost
 Three O'Clock in the Morning (1923) lost
 Roulette (1924) lost
 Painted People (1924) lost
 Damaged Hearts (1924) lost
 Why Men Leave Home (1924) extant, MGM and/or George Eastman House
 The Woman on the Jury (1924) lost 
 The Spirit of the USA (1924) extant, abridged version
 For Sale (1924) lost
 A Self-Made Failure (1924) lost, trailer only in the Library of Congress
 The Mine with the Iron Door (1924) extant, Gosfilmofond and Bois d'Arcy, France
 Three Women (1924) extant
 East of Broadway (1924) extant, Cineteca Italiana
 On the Stroke of Three (1924) lost
 Easy Money (1925) extant, Library of Congress
 Capital Punishment (1925) extant, Filmmuseum Amsterdam and UCLA Film and Television Archive
 The Parasite (1925) extant, Library of Congress
 The Night Ship (1925) lost
 The Re-Creation of Brian Kent (1925) extant', Library of Congress
 School for Wives (1925) lost
 The Wizard of Oz (1925) as Aunt Em, extant
 Go Straight (1925) extant, Library of Congress
 Drusilla with a Million (1925) extant, Lobster Films, France
 A Slave of Fashion (1925) lost
 The Fighting Cub (1925) extant, UCLA (one reel missing)
 His Master's Voice (1925) extant, Grapevine Video
 Big Pal (1925) extant
 The Red Kimona (1925) extant, Library of Congress
 Hogan's Alley (1925) extant
 Flaming Waters (1925) extant, Library of Congress
 The Gold Hunters (1925) lost
 Stop, Look and Listen (1926) lost
 Her Own Story (1926) lost
 The King of the Turf (1926) extant, Cinematheque Belgique, Brussels
 Pleasures of the Rich (1926) lost, trailer in the Library of Congress
 The Night Watch (1926) lost
 The Night Patrol (1926) extant
 Somebody's Mother (1926) lost
 Fourth Commandment (1926) extant, BFI National Film & TV
 The Wise Guy (1926) extant, National Archives of Canada
 The Hidden Way (1926) extant, New Zealand Film Archive, Museum of Modern Art
 Frenzied Flames (1926) extant, Cinematheque de Belgique, Cineteca Italiana
 The Midnight Message (1926) extant, Library of Congress
 The False Alarm (1926) lost according to IMDb
 Dame Chance (1926) extant, Library of Congress
 Atta Boy(1926) extant, UCLA Film and Television Archive
 Whom Shall I Marry (1926) incomplete, BFI (missing a reel)
 The Show Girl (1927) extant, UCLA Film and Television Archive
 Blonde or Brunette (1927) extant, Library of Congress
 God's Great Wilderness (1927) lost
 Paying the Price (1927) incomplete, Library of Congress
 False Morals (1927) extant, Library of Congress
 Special Delivery (1927) extant, Library of Congress
 The Swell-Head (1927) lost
 Better Days (1927) extant, Library of Congress
 Jesse James (1927) lost
 On Your Toes (1927) lost
 Frenzy (1928 short)
 Dame Care (1928) lost
 A Million for Love (1928) lost
 Ehre deine Mutter (Honour Thy Mother) (1928)
 Love Over Night (1928) extant, Museum of Modern Art
 Some Mother's Boy (1929) extant, BFI National Film and Television London

Sound films

 Lights of New York (1928)
 Sailor's Holiday (1929)
 Second Wife (1930)
 Trailin Trouble (1930)
 Ladies in Love (1930)
 Hot Curves (1930)
 The Utah Kid (1930)
 Just Imagine (1930)
 Midnight Special (1930)
 Primrose Path (1931)
 Kept Husbands (1931)
 Beyond Victory (1931)
 Stout Hearts and Willing Hands (1931)
 Honeymoon Lane (1931)
 One Good Turn (1931)
 The Fighting Marshall (1931)
 The Law of the Tong (1931)
 The Fighting Fool (1932)
 Pack Up Your Troubles (1932)
 Young Blood (1932)
 Forbidden Trail (1932)
 Gun Law (1933)
 The Moonshiner's Daughter (1933 short)
 Flying Devils (1933)
 Police Call (1933)
 The Power and the Glory (1933)
 Bombshell (1933)
 Headline Shooter (1933) (uncredited)
 Bedside (1934) (uncredited)
 Love Past Thirty (1934)
 Change of Heart (1934)
 The Loudspeaker (1934)
 Whom the Gods Destroy (1934)
 The World Accuses (1934)
 The Silver Streak (1934)
 Fighting Lady (1935)
 Go Into Your Dance (1935) (uncredited)
 Silk Hat Kid (1935) (uncredited)
 I Don't Remember (1935 short)
 The Sea Fiend (1936)
 The Country Doctor (1936) (uncredited)
 Gentle Julia (1936) (uncredited)
 Postal Inspector (1936) (uncredited)
 Rich Relations (1937)
 Music for Madame (1937) (uncredited)
 West of Rainbow's End (1938)
 East Side of Heaven (1939 (uncredited)
 The Shop Around the Corner (1940) (uncredited)
 Manhattan Heartbeat (1940)
 Haunted House (1940)
 Model Wife (1941) (uncredited)
 Eagle Squadron (1942)
 Oregon Trail (1945)
 Partners in Time (1946)
 Friendly Persuasion (1956)

References

External links

 
 Mary Carr at Virtual History

1874 births
1973 deaths
American silent film actresses
American film actresses
Actresses from Pennsylvania
Burials at Calvary Cemetery (Los Angeles)
20th-century American actresses